Masala is a 2013 Indian Telugu-language action film directed by K. Vijaya Bhaskar. It is produced by D. Suresh Babu and Sravanthi Ravi Kishore on Suresh Productions and Sri Sravanthi Movies. The film stars Venkatesh, Ram Pothineni, Anjali and Shazahn Padamsee with music composed by S. Thaman. It is a remake of the 2012 Hindi film Bol Bachchan  The film released worldwide on 14 November 2013.  Upon release, the film received mixed reviews from critics with appreciation to the cast performances.

Cast 

 Venkatesh as Venkata Raja Narasimha Balaram
 Ram Pothineni as Rehman/ Ram (Fake Name)
 Anjali as Sania / Sarita / Savitri [Portrait]
 Jaya Prakash Reddy as Eddulu Kameshwar Rao
 Shazahn Padamsee as Meenakshi
 M. S. Narayana as Narayana Rao
 Kovai Sarala as Anjali Devi / Chintamani
 Ali as Suri
 Posani Krishna Murali as Nagaraju
 Suman Shetty as Suri's Drama mate
 Master Bharath as Suri's friend
 Venu Madhav as Census officer
 Brahmanandam
 Ramjagan

Soundtrack 

Music composed by S. Thaman. Lyrics were written by Krishna Chaitanya.  The music released on ADITYA Music Company. The Music received a positive response from both critics and audience alike.

Production

Development 
The film had its formal pooja ceremony on 13 March 2013 at Ramanaidu Studios in Hyderabad. The event had the crew of the film in full attendance and Ram clapped for the muhurat shot. Since Venkatesh was out of town and he couldn't attend the film's launch. Though Initially it was named "Garam Masala", it was officially renamed as "Gol Maal", which was confirmed by the Producers. Later on the titles "Ram – Balaram" and "Masala" were considered. Finally, the title was confirmed as "Masala" after the first look poster was released in September 2013.

Casting 
Venkatesh and Ram were the first persons who were signed for this film in 2012. This film marks the third collaboration of Venkatesh with Vijaya Bhaskar after Nuvvu Naaku Nachav and Malliswari. Venkatesh would sport a twirled moustache in the same way which he was last seen in Gautham Menon's Gharshana. Later Anjali and Shazahn Padamsee were roped to play the siblings of Ram and Venkatesh in the film respectively. This film marked the second film of Anjali with Venkatesh after Seethamma Vakitlo Sirimalle Chettu, which was also a multistarrer film. It also marked the second film of Bollywood Actress Shazahn Padamsee after the 2010 film Orange. During the Thai Schedule of the film, Ram learnt Muay Thai, a famous boxing technique in Thailand. Jaya Prakash Reddy, Ali, M. S. Narayana and Kovai Sarala were roped in to play important roles in the film.

Filming 
The film's first schedule was held in Hyderabad and few scenes were shot on Ram and Anjali. Late it was reported in the end of March that After a major schedule in Bangalore, the film will also be shot in Panchgani, near Pune. Later, Anjali, who couldn't join the film unit in Bangalore after she went missing, had promised to join the film's shooting in Panchgani. During the shoot, Rohit Shetty, the director of Bol Bachchan visited the sets and wished the team for the movie's success. In June, a fight sequence was canned on Venkatesh and Ram at Ramoji Film City in Hyderabad amidst the principal star crew's presence. In July, the complete talkie portion was shot and it was reported that only two songs were left to shoot. Later a song on Ram and Shahzan Padamsee were shot at Thailand. A song on Venkatesh and Anjali was planned to be shot in Japan from 3 September 2013. The song was shot at Hokkaido, the second largest island in Japan. The title song was shot in October in which Venkatesh, Ram, Jayaprakash Reddy, Kovai Sarala and Ali took part in the shoot thus wrapping the film's shoot.

Release 
AustraliaTelugu won the overseas rights for screening in Australia and New Zealand. The film had its worldwide theatrical release on 14 November 2013 to 1000 screens.

The film was dubbed into Hindi as Ek Aur Bol Bachchan in 2014 and released by S.N. Media Pvt. Ltd.

Reception

Critical response 
The film received positive reviews on an average. 123telugu.com gave a review stating "Masala has a few good moments. Venkatesh and Ram have tried their best to carry the film with their comedy timing. But a stale plot and outdated screenplay hamper their efforts. Any Masala gets a perfect flavour and taste only when the ingredients are blended in the right proportions. Sadly, that is not the case with this Masala" and rated the film 2.75/5.  Times of AP gave a review stating "Overall, an okay film. Nice enjoyable movie. As comedy plays a major role especially for Telugu audience, this film will get pass marks. It will run with good openings and may continue to a certain extent until another big movie comes for competition. Masala is a worth watching for all comedy lovers" and rated the film 3.25/5. way2movies.com gave a review stating "Masala had several clichés with confusion dramas that were seen in recent comedy releases, yet the screenplay packed with entertainment and silly gags works for the movie. Venkatesh, Ram's performances, Anil Ravipudi's dialogues and entertaining scenes are assets for the film while actions scenes, poor VFX works and weak climax are the negative points. Masala is decent enough to entertain comedy film lovers, provided you don't look for logic." gulte.com gave a review stating "Masala is a complete commercial formulaic film that sticks to the genre. It is more of a comedy entertainer with a touch of action. In a nutshell, Masala is for comedy movie lovers that don't care about the logics and other nuances of cinema. Content wise it is an average film and can be watched once for Venkatesh and Ram. It has enough to stay afloat at the box office and we have to wait and see if it can swim across to a safe zone or not" and rated the film 3/5 terming it a "Time pass 'Masala' fare!".

References

External links 
 

2013 films
Telugu remakes of Hindi films
2013 action comedy films
Indian action comedy films
Films shot at Ramoji Film City
Films shot in Japan
Films shot in Bangalore
2010s Telugu-language films
Films shot in Bangkok
Films directed by K. Vijaya Bhaskar
2013 comedy films
Suresh Productions films
Films scored by Thaman S